The Piazza delle Gondole ("Square of Gondolas") is a piazza in Pisa, Italy. It is next to one of the city gates in the medieval walls. The square includes a small basin where boats used to dock.

External links 
 Piazza delle Gondole information 

Gondole, Piazza delle